This is a list of events and standings for the Professional Fighters League, a mixed martial arts organization based in the United States, for the 2022 season.

2022 world champions

PFL Challenger Series 

PFL Challenger Series is an American mixed martial arts promotion. Young and up-and-coming male and female MMA prospects will compete for a slot in the PFL tournament season and a chance at $1 million. Each week, the PFL Challenger Series will consist of a celebrity guest panel featuring personalities in film, athletics, and music. The PFL Challenger Series will debut on fuboTV. The eight events will stream on consecutive Friday nights starting Feb. 18, and run through March. It will also air on its linear network, Fubo Sports Network.

2022 Contract Winners:

 HW: Adam Keresh 
 LHW: Bruce Souto, Simeon Powell was signed to a development league contract
 WW: Jarrah Al Silawa, Chris Mixan was signed to a development league contract
 LW: Bruno Miranda, Alexei Pergande was signed to a development league contract
 W LW: Martina Jindrová
 FW: Boston Salmon

Events 
As part off a new multi-year deal with ESPN, the first event of the 2022 PFL season will kick off on April 20, 2022. The new deal includes “expanded media rights,” with the entirety of the PFL's 2022 playoffs, as well as the “majority of regular season events” to simulcast on ESPN and ESPN+. Additional event coverage will also be featured on ESPN2.

Playoffs

2022 PFL Heavyweight playoffs

Bruno Cappelozza was originally scheduled to face Denis Goltsov but was unable to continue in the tournament. He was replaced by #7 ranked Matheus Scheffel.
Denis Goltsov was originally scheduled to face Matheus Scheffel but was unable to continue in the tournament. He was replaced by #6 ranked Juan Adams.

2022 PFL Light Heavyweight playoffs

 Antônio Carlos Júnior was originally scheduled to face Omari Akhmedov but was unable to continue in the tournament. He was replaced by #5 ranked Josh Silveira.

2022 PFL Welterweight playoffs

Magomed Umalatov was originally scheduled to face Rory MacDonald but was unable to continue in the tournament. He was replaced by #7 ranked Dilano Taylor.

2022 PFL Lightweight playoffs

2022 PFL Women's Lightweight playoffs

2022 PFL Featherweight playoffs

Standings
The PFL points system is based on results of the match.  The winner of a fight receives 3 points.  If the fight ends in a draw, both fighters will receive 1 point. A no-contest will be scored as a draw.  The bonus for winning a fight in the first, second, or third round is 3 points, 2 points, and 1 point respectively. The bonus for winning in the third round requires a fight be stopped before 4:59 of the third round.  No bonus point will be awarded if a fighter wins via decision.  For example, if a fighter wins a fight in the first round, then the fighter will receive 6 total points. A decision win will result in three total points.  If a fighter misses weight, the opponent (should they comply with weight limits) will receive 3 points due to a walkover victory, regardless of winning or losing the bout, with the fighter who missed weight being deducted 1 standings point;  if the non-offending fighter subsequently wins with a stoppage, all bonus points will be awarded. A fighter who was unable to compete for any reason, will receive a 1-point
penalty (-1 point in the standings). The fighters who made weight will not receive a walkover, but will earn points and contracted purse amounts based on their performance in the altered matchup.

Heavyweight

Light Heavyweight

Welterweight

Lightweight

Women's Lightweight

Featherweight

Broadcast
On January 26, 2022, it was announced that PFL had extended their broadcast deal with ESPN. The contract extension included the seven events planned for the 2022 season, which would be broadcast on the main ESPN channel and simulcast on ESPN+.

The 2022 PFL season will be broadcast by RMC Sport in France. Both the 2022 PFL season and the inagurual PFL Challenger Series will be broadcast by Channel 4 in the United Kingdom and Ireland.

See also 

 List of PFL events
 List of current PFL fighters
 2022 in UFC
 2022 in Bellator MMA
 2022 in ONE Championship
 2022 in Absolute Championship Akhmat
 2022 in Konfrontacja Sztuk Walki
 2022 in Rizin Fighting Federation
 2022 in AMC Fight Nights 
 2022 in Brave Combat Federation
 2022 in Road FC
 2022 in Eagle Fighting Championship
 2022 in Legacy Fighting Alliance

References 

2022
PFL